Pulicaria vulgaris is a species of flowering plant belonging to the family Asteraceae.

Its native range is Europe to Western Siberia, the Himalaya, and Northern Africa.

References

vulgaris